Gokula Singh (also known as Veer Gokula, or Gokal or Gokul Singh Jat; died on 1 January 1670 AD) was a Jat zamindar of Tilpat, belonging to Haga(Agre/Agha) gotra, in what is now the state of Haryana, India. The second of four sons born to Madu, his birthname was Ola. Gokula provided leadership to the Jats who challenged the power of the Mughal Empire.

Rebellion
Abdul Nabi had also committed some excesses on the Jat Hindus, which incited the rebellion. Abdul Nabi established a cantonment near Gokul Singh and conducted all his operations from there. They gathered at the village of Sahora where, During May 1669, Abdul Nabi was killed while attempting to seize it. Gokula and his fellow farmers moved further, attacking and destroying the Sadabad cantonment. This inspired the Hindus to fight against the Mughal rulers, who were there to destroy all Hindu rebels in exchange of Gokula Land and territories. The fighting continued for five months. In the meantime, after Gokula's death, Churaman had strengthened the Jat fort of Sinsini near Bharatpur, and they sacked regions around Agra and Delhi. Akbar's tomb was looted and according to legends the grave of Akbar was dug up..

Battle of Tilpat 
In 1669, Gokula Singh with 20,000 followers faced the Mughals 20 miles from Tilpat. Abdul nabi attacked them. At first he appeared to be gaining ground, but in the middle of the fighting he was killed on 12 May 1669 (21st Zil-Hijja, 1079 A.H.).
They retreated to Tilpat, where Hasan Ali followed and besieged them with the reinforcement of 1000 Musketeers, 1000 Rocketmen, and 25 artillery pieces. Amanulla, the Faujdar of the environs of Agra were also sent to reinforce Hasan Ali.

Death

Gokula was killed brutally for treason on 1 January 1670.

See also
 Raja Ram Jat
 Suraj Mal

References

 

Medieval India
History of Rajasthan
Deaths by blade weapons
1670 deaths
Year of birth unknown
Jat